Khaled Lounici (born 9 July 1967 in Algiers) is a retired Algerian professional football player and later manager. He spent the majority of his playing career with USM El Harrach.

He represented Algeria in two major tournaments, which were the 1996 African Nations Cup and the 1989 FIFA Futsal World Championship.

References

External links
FIFA profile at fifa.com
rsssf

1967 births
Living people
Footballers from Algiers
Algerian footballers
Association football forwards
Algeria international footballers
1996 African Cup of Nations players
USM El Harrach players
Aydınspor footballers
JS Bordj Ménaïel players
Al-Qadsiah FC players
USM Alger players
MC Alger players
Algerian Ligue Professionnelle 1 players
Süper Lig players
TFF First League players
Algerian Ligue 2 players
Algerian expatriate footballers
Expatriate footballers in Turkey
Algerian expatriate sportspeople in Turkey
Expatriate footballers in Saudi Arabia
Algerian expatriate sportspeople in Saudi Arabia
Algerian football managers
USM El Harrach managers
MO Béjaïa managers
Olympique de Médéa managers
USM Annaba managers
Paradou AC managers
RC Arbaâ managers
MC El Eulma managers
USM Blida managers
Algerian Ligue Professionnelle 1 managers
Algerian expatriate football managers
Expatriate football managers in Tunisia
Algerian expatriate sportspeople in Tunisia
21st-century Algerian people
20th-century Algerian people